Guyana is one of the newest petroleum producing regions in the world, making the first commercial grade crude oil draw in December 2019. Crude oil is sent abroad for refining.

Early Explorations 
Historically, Guyana is a net importer of fuel. Guyana's offshore Guyana Basin and the inland Takatu Basin have attracted foreign companies such as Shell, Total and Mobil since the 1940s, who completed much geological surveyance of the area and drilled a number of wells. In the Takatu Basin, 3 wells were dug between 1981 and 1993, however they were dry or not found to be commercially viable.

Offshore oil exploration began in the 1950's, and 9 wells were drilled between 1965 and 1970, only one of which struck oil, Abary-1 well in the Kanuku  license area. In the late 1980's, Mobil, Total, Guyana Exploration and BHP continued exploration in the region.

In the mid-2000s, CGX Energy attempted to spud a well but the rig was deterred by Surinamese gunboats claiming they were in Surinamese waters.  United Nations International Tribunal for the Law of the Sea (ITLOS) settled the border dispute in September 2007 but no further wells were dug until 2012.

As of 2020, Guyana has nine petroleum blocks under active leases, of which six have had active exploration. The Petroleum Division of the Guyana Geology and Mines Commission has the responsibility of monitoring exploration in Guyana.

2015 Liza Oilfield Discovery 
Esso, a subsidiary of ExxonMobil, began exploring the off-shore region in 2008. In May 2015 ExxonMobil announced discovery of more than 90 metres of high-quality, oil-bearing sandstone reservoirs about 200 km off the coastline, considered to be one of the largest crude oil discovery of the past decade. Subsequent discoveries were made in early 2018 at sites Payara, Liza deep, Snoek, Turbot, Ranger and Pacora.

The Liza-1 well was drilled to 5,433 metres in 1,742 metres of water, and was the first well on the Stabroek block, which is 26,800 square kilometres in size. Early estimates claimed the area contained 700 million barrels of oil (a total value of US$40 billion, international crude price at the time of discovery). Continued discoveries by ExxonMobil and Hess increased that estimate to exceeding 4 billion barrels of oil equivalent, potentially producing 750,000 barrels per day by 2025. Yet another assessment in early 2020 has since elevated the amount to eight billion barrels of oil equivalent.

Liza Phase 1 project in the Stabroek block began producing crude 20 December 2019.

Challenges 
Predictions about the windfall of this significant oil discovery made a significant impact on the country, including the 2020 presidential elections. There is also the threat of the oil curse, which effects similar resource-rich countries.

There are also concerns of large international companies getting an unfair share of ownership of oil royalties. Natural-resources watchdog group, Global Witness, reported that Guyana may have lost as much as $55 billion in potential revenue from negotiations that favored Exxon. Exxon refuted the claim based on unaccounted for costs of the high risk involved in exploring the "frontier hydrocarbon province".

Border Dispute with Venezuela 
The oil and gas exploration activity by Guyana created a new source of tension with neighboring Venezuela. The 2015 discovery set off a round of recriminations between Venezuela and its eastern border neighbor. Officials in Caracas, which has long had claims on Guyana's Essequibo region, have alleged that the concession is located in disputed waters. This wasn't the first off-shore border dispute, as then-President Burnham had addressed the United Nations in 1968 over Venezuelan claims of area up to 12 miles from disputed territories. Prior to this, a border award was agreed upon in 1899 as the result of a case overseen by U.S Chief Justice Melville Fuller, however in 1954 a memorandum by one of the lawyers was published posthumously, questioning the validity of the award as unfairly to the benefit of British Guiana.

Regulation 
Petroleum (Exploration and Production) Act 1986 (PEPA) grants government power over granting licenses for petroleum prospecting and production.

Natural Resource Fund Act 2019 established a fund for government proceeds from petroleum operations, to be operated by the Bank of Guyana.

References

External links 
 Guyana Geology and Mines Commission

Economy of Guyana